Arsenic oxide may refer to any of the following:

Arsenic dioxide, As2O4
Arsenic trioxide, As2O3
Arsenic pentoxide, As2O5